Maly Lyakhovsky Island is the second largest of the Lyakhovsky Islands belonging to the New Siberian Islands archipelago in Laptev Sea in northern Russia.

The Lyakhovsky Islands are named in honour of Ivan Lyakhov, who explored them in 1773.

Geology
Maly Lyakhovsky Island consists of Upper Jurassic to lower Cretaceous turbidites, also known as flysch, covered by a thin veneer of Pliocene to Pleistocene sediments. The Mesozoic rocks are covered by a relatively thin layer of Pliocene to Pleistocene sandy and clayey sediments of colluvial and alluvial origin. Near the coast, the alluvial sediments grade into nearshore marine sediments containing fossil marine mollusks and lignitized wood. Thick permafrost characterized by massive ice wedges has developed in these sediments.

On 29 May 2013, an expedition of North-Eastern Federal University found the remains of a 10,000-year-old carcass of a female mammoth on Maliy Lyakhovsky Island. It was speculated that this find might reveal information about the cryoprotective properties of mammoth blood. The mammoth remains were taken to Yakutsk in Sakha Republic, Russia,  for bacterial examination and tissues analysis, especially for a joint project of NEFU and Sooam Biotech Research Foundation in cloning a mammoth.

Vegetation
Rush/grass, forb, cryptogam tundra covers Maly Lyakhovsky Island. It is tundra consisting mostly of very low-growing grasses, rushes, forbs, mosses, lichens, and liverworts. These plants either mostly or completely cover the surface of the ground. The soils are typically moist, fine-grained, and often hummocky.

See also 
 List of mammoths

References

External links
Andreev, A.A., and D.M. Peteet, 1999, Climate and Diet of Mammoths in the East Siberian Arctic . Science Briefs (August 1999). Goddard Institute for Space Studies, New York, New York. Last visited July 12, 2008.
Anisimov, M.A., and V.E. Tumskoy, 2002, Environmental History of the Novosibirskie Islands for the last 12 ka. 32nd International Arctic Workshop, Program and Abstracts 2002. Institute of Arctic and Alpine Research, University of Colorado at Boulder, pp 23–25.
anonymous, nd,  aerial photographs of these islands.
Kuznetsova, T.V., L.D. Sulerzhitsky, Ch. Siegert, 2001, New data on the "Mammoth" fauna of the Laptev Shelf Land (East Siberian Arctic), 144 KB PDF file, The World of Elephants – International Congress, Rome 2001. Consiglio Nazionale delle Ricerche, Centro di Studio per il Quaternario e l'Evoluzione Ambientale, Università di Roma, Roma, Italy.
Schirrmeister, L., H.-W. Hubberten, V. Rachold, and V.G. Grosse, 2005, Lost world – Late Quaternary environment of periglacial Arctic shelves and coastal lowlands in NE-Siberia. 2nd International Alfred Wegener Symposium Bremerhaven, October, 30 – November 2, 2005.

New Siberian Islands
Lyakhovsky Islands
Islands of the Sakha Republic